Poike or Windermere is a suburb of Tauranga, in the Bay of Plenty Region of New Zealand's North Island.

Demographics

Poike had a population of 789 at the 2018 New Zealand census, an increase of 51 people (6.9%) since the 2013 census, and a decrease of 15 people (−1.9%) since the 2006 census. There were 261 households, comprising 375 males and 417 females, giving a sex ratio of 0.9 males per female. The median age was 28.6 years (compared with 37.4 years nationally), with 198 people (25.1%) aged under 15 years, 225 (28.5%) aged 15 to 29, 312 (39.5%) aged 30 to 64, and 57 (7.2%) aged 65 or older.

Ethnicities were 74.5% European/Pākehā, 32.3% Māori, 3.0% Pacific peoples, 4.9% Asian, and 1.1% other ethnicities. People may identify with more than one ethnicity.

The percentage of people born overseas was 16.0, compared with 27.1% nationally.

Although some people chose not to answer the census's question about religious affiliation, 60.8% had no religion, 22.1% were Christian, 4.9% had Māori religious beliefs, 0.4% were Hindu and 3.4% had other religions.

Of those at least 15 years old, 69 (11.7%) people had a bachelor's or higher degree, and 84 (14.2%) people had no formal qualifications. The median income was $26,900, compared with $31,800 nationally. 39 people (6.6%) earned over $70,000 compared to 17.2% nationally. The employment status of those at least 15 was that 312 (52.8%) people were employed full-time, 102 (17.3%) were part-time, and 33 (5.6%) were unemployed.

Education

Toi Ohomai Institute of Technology is based in Poike.

Te Whakatipuranga, a secondary school teen parent unit, is also based on the same campus.

References

Suburbs of Tauranga
Populated places around the Tauranga Harbour